Karamanli Turkish is a dialect of the Turkish language spoken by the Karamanlides. Although the official Ottoman Turkish was written in the Arabic script, the Karamanlides used the Greek alphabet to write their form of Turkish. Karamanlı Turkish had its own literary tradition and produced numerous published works in print during the 19th century, some of them published by the British and Foreign Bible Society as well as by Evangelinos Misailidis in the Anatoli or Misailidis publishing house.

Karamanlı writers and speakers were expelled from Turkey as part of the Greek-Turkish population exchange in 1923. Some speakers preserved their language in the diaspora. The written form stopped being used immediately after Turkey adopted the Latin alphabet.

A fragment of a manuscript written in Karamanlı was also found in the Cairo Geniza.

Sample Text 
Kamayim vurdum yere is a folk dance belonging to the Karamanlides & Turkish-speaking Cappadocian Greeks.

Lyrics

Καμαΐμ βουρντούμ γερέ

Κανληνήμ ντόλτου ντερέ

Αχ μεντίλ μεντίλ μεντίλ, γκάλντηρ κολλάρην μεντίλ

Χεπ σιοζλέρνιν μπιρ γιαλάντηρ 

Γκιρ κογιουνουμά ινάντηρ.

Τσαγρήν ανάν μη γκέλσιν; Μπενίμ ακράμπαμ νερέ;

Καμά τσεκέριμ καμά

Μπιρ κηζ βερίν αρκαμά

Μπιρ κηζ μπανά τσοκ μουντούρ

Μα λενιζντέ γιοκ μου ντούρ.

Transliteration

Kamayim vurdum yere

Kanlınım doldu dere

Ah mendil mendil mendil galdır golların mendil endir 

Hep sözlerin bir yalandır gir goynuma inandır.

Çağrın anan mı gelsin? Benim akrabam nere?

Kama çekerim kama 

Bir kız verin arkama 

Bir kız bana çok mudur 

Ma’lenızde yök mu dur.

Orthography

Media 

There was a Karamanli Turkish newspaper, Anatoli, published from 1850 to 1922, made by Evangelinos Misailidis. Other publications in Karamanli were Anatol Ahteri, Angeliaforos, Angeliaforos coçuklar içun, Şafak, and Terakki. The second and third were created by the American Board of Commissioners for Foreign Missions. Demetrius Nicolaides also applied to make his own Karamanli publication, Asya ("Asia"), but was denied; he instead made an Ottoman Turkish newspaper called Servet. Evangelina Baltia and Ayșe Kavak, authors of "Publisher of the newspaper Konstantinoupolis for half a century," wrote that they could find no information explaining why Nicolaides' proposal was turned down.

Works and translations in Karamanli Turkish

Books and translations 
Up to 500 works of literature are thought to have been printed in Karamanli. One of the largest distributors of these works was the British and Foreign Bible Society which published numerous editions of the Old Testament and the New Testament. A Karamanli author named Anastasios Karakioulaphis translated Aristotle's Physiognomica from Greek to Karamanli. Other translations include Confucius' works and Xavier de Montepin's novels. A great deal of books and works in the Karamanli dialect are preserved in the Centre of Asia Minor Studies in Athens, Greece.

Inscriptions 
Karamanli inscriptions have been found in many cemeteries in Turkey, most of them in Balıklı. Many of these inscriptions often talk about the humble origins of unimportant craftsmen from central Anatolia. According to historian Richard Clogg, these inscriptions offer a "glimpse of a long past world of Greek and Turkish symbiosis".

Sources 
 Evangelia Balta, Karamanlı Yazınsal Mirasının Ocaklarında Madencilik, 2019, Yapı Kredi Yayınları. 
 —, 19. Yüzyıl Osmanlıca ve Karamanlıca Yayınlarda Ezop’un Hayatı ve Masalları (prep.), 2019, Libra Kitap.
 —, Karamanlıca Kitaplar Çözümlemeli Bibliyografya Cilt I: 1718-1839 (Karamanlıdıka Bibliographie Analytique Tome I: 1718-1839), 2018, Türkiye İş Bankası Kültür Yayınları.
 —, Gerçi Rum İsek de, Rumca Bilmez Türkçe Sözleriz: Karamanlılar ve Karamanlıca Edebiyat Üzerine Araştırmalar, 2012, Türkiye İş Bankası Kültür Yayınları.

References 

Agglutinative languages
Medieval languages
Ottoman culture
Cappadocian Greeks
Writing systems
 *
Languages attested from the 19th century
Turkish dialects
Turkish language